John Richard Burke (born September 7, 1971) is a former professional American football tight end. He played in the National Football League (NFL) for the New England Patriots, New York Jets and San Diego Chargers.

Burke grew up in Holmdel Township, New Jersey and attended Holmdel High School.

References

1971 births
Living people
Holmdel High School alumni
Sportspeople from Elizabeth, New Jersey
Sportspeople from Monmouth County, New Jersey
People from Holmdel Township, New Jersey
American football tight ends
Virginia Tech Hokies football players
New England Patriots players
New York Jets players
San Diego Chargers players
Players of American football from New Jersey